Katie Ford (born April 29, 1975 in Portland, Oregon) is an American poet, essayist, and professor.

Life
She was born to Mary and Michael Ford. She has two siblings, Kristin and Brian. She began writing at the age of 19, while earning her B.A. in English from Whitman College. Soon after, she earned her Master’s in Divinity from Harvard. Ford went on to pursue her Master’s in Fine Arts  (MFA), with a concentration in poetry, from Iowa’s Writers Workshop. Along with her published poetry collections— Deposition, Colosseum, and Storm—her individual poems and essays can be found in many contemporary journals and reviews. Ford is currently a professor at University of California, Riverside.

While a 19-year-old student at Whitman College earning her  B.A. in English, Ford began writing poetry. In an interview with Devil’s Lake magazine board member, Nancy Reddy, Ford attributed her growth as a writer to poet, author, and playwright, Tess Gallagher: “In my last year of college, I studied under Tess Gallagher, and that was utterly formative for my ideas about poetry and  poetics, especially in terms of lyricism and figuration.”

Ford also credits poet Jorie Graham for inspiration during her studies at Harvard, where she earned a Master’s in Divinity and began work on her first poetry collection, Deposition.  She then went on to receive a Master’s in Fine Arts (MFA) from the University of Iowa.

Ford’s individual poems have appeared in many journals and  reviews, such as American Literary Review, The New Yorker, The American Poetry Review, The Paris Review, Seneca Review, Ploughshares, Poets & Writers, and Pleiades. She has three published works,  including Deposition, Colosseum, and Storm. Her debut collection, Deposition, confronts God, violence, and Christian belief.

Her book Colosseum,  which was named “Best Book of 2008” by Publishers Weekly, explores the theme of ruination and pulls from Ford’s personal experiences as a resident of New Orleans when Hurricane Katrina drove thousands out of their homes. The New York Times Book Review stated that Ford’s poetry, “possess[es]  the veiled brilliance of stained glass windows seen at night.” With short lyrical poems, Storm continues on the theme of ruination with a focus on the efforts to escape New Orleans in the aftermath of the hurricane.

Ford’s poem, “The Soul,” from her most recent book, Blood Lyrics (Graywolf Press, 2014) was selected for publication by the Public Poetry Project of the Pennsylvania Center for the Book in 2013.

From 2005-2009, Ford served as the poetry editor of the New Orleans Review and taught at  Loyola University and Reed College. She taught creative writing and literature in contemporary poetry at Franklin and Marshall College and is now at the Department of Creative Writing in the University of California, Riverside
She now lives in South Pasadena with her daughter, Maggie after living in Philadelphia with her ex-husband, novelist Josh Emmons

Bibliography

Poetry

Collections

Poems

Essays and reporting

Awards
 Lannan Foundation Fellowship
 Levis Reading Prize
 grants from the Academy of American Poets and the PEN American Center

References

External links
"Interview with Poet Katie Ford", I Go Searching For Music, Jesse Nathan, sfstation, May 30, 2008 (error 404 on 16-01-2021)
"Repossessing Virtue: Katie Ford on Poetry, Katrina, and Wasting One’s Life", Speaking of Faith, Krista Tippett, February 14, 2009, American Public Media (not existing on 16-01-2021)
Mayhew, Kristen. "Author Biographies." Author Biographies. Ed. Nicole Miyashiro. Pennsylvania State University, 2013. Web. 14 Apr. 2016.<https://secureapps.libraries.psu.edu/PACFTB/bios/biography.cfm?AuthorID=8137>.

1975 births
Reed College faculty
Harvard Divinity School alumni
University of Iowa alumni
Franklin & Marshall College faculty
Living people
American women poets
21st-century American poets
21st-century American women writers
Writers from Portland, Oregon
Poets from Oregon
University of California, Riverside faculty
Whitman College alumni
American women academics